The 34th: The Story of Marriage Equality in Ireland is an Irish documentary film by Linda Cullen and Vanessa Gildea. The film tells the story of the people who formed Marriage Equality in Ireland, and explores the events that led to the Thirty-fourth Amendment of the Constitution (Marriage Equality) Act 2015 (previously bill no. 5 of 2015), which amended the Constitution of Ireland to permit marriage to be contracted by two persons without distinction as to their sex.

The film

The film uses interviews with former board members and staff from Marriage Equality alongside archive material to outline the tell the story of their campaign, spanning from the Zappone & Gilligan v. Revenue Commissioners & Ors high court case in 2006 (also known as the KAL Case) to The thirty-fourth Amendment of the Constitution of Ireland in 2015.

The 34th has garnered acclaim among critics and audiences, winning the Audience Award and the Spirit of Gaze Award at the 25th Annual Gaze LGBT Film Festival in 2017, and earning an official selection at the Queer Screen's Mardi Gras Film Festival in 2018. The film also won the Audience Award “Dokula” at the 29th Hamburg International Queer Film Festival.

Production 
The 34th was directed and produced by Linda Cullen and Vanessa Gildea, and edited by Cúán Mac Conghail.

Release 
The film premiered at the 25th Annual Gaze LGBT Film Festival in 2017, where it won the Audience Award and the Spirit of Gaze Award. It was released on Netflix in the UK and Ireland on the 4th of November 2018.

Accolades

References

External links 

Irish documentary films
2017 films
Same-sex marriage in the Republic of Ireland
Irish LGBT-related films
LGBT-related films based on actual events
2017 documentary films
English-language Irish films
2017 LGBT-related films
Documentaries about LGBT topics
2010s English-language films